A Simple Man may refer to:
 A Simple Man (book), a book written by Ronnie Kasrils on South African President Jacob Zuma
 The Measure of a Man (2015 film), a French drama film

See also
 Simple Man (disambiguation)